Bence Szabó (born 10 January 1990, in Budapest) is a professional Hungarian footballer currently plays for Unione FC Budapest.

External links
 HLSZ 
 MLSZ 

1990 births
Living people
Footballers from Budapest
Hungarian footballers
Association football forwards
Újpest FC players
Pécsi MFC players
Vasas SC players
Egri FC players
FC Tatabánya players
Nemzeti Bajnokság I players